Edmonds Heights K-12 is a parent-school partnership program which supports parents who choose to be the primary educators of their children.  Edmonds Heights offers classes to children ranging from kindergarten age to 12th grade. The EHK12 campus is located in a large section of the former Woodway High School campus. It is open four days a week and runs on a semester schedule. The school operates under the  WAC 392-121-182 Alternative Learning Experience Requirements. Students and parents are required to submit monthly Progress Reports and develop a written student learning plan (WSLP) each month. Students are also expected to meet with certificated teachers at least monthly.

References

Alternative schools in the United States
Buildings and structures in Snohomish County, Washington
Edmonds, Washington
Private high schools in Washington (state)
Private middle schools in Washington (state)
Private elementary schools in Washington (state)